Allosidastrum is a New World genus comprising four species in the tribe Malveae in the family Malvaceae. Members of the genus are woody, bearing ovate leaves with long petioles. Flowers - borne without calyculi - bear small, basally rounded calyxes of a length greater than that of their pedicels and whitish or palely yellow petals. Gynoeciums each consist of five to nine carpels and mature into fruits that yield one seed for each of their carpels.

Species
, Plants of the World Online recognised the following species:

References 

Malveae
Malvaceae genera